Sirana  is a genus of moths in the subfamily Lymantriinae. The genus was erected by Paul Griveaud in 1976.

Species
Sirana ankalirano Griveaud, 1977
Sirana beloha Griveaud, 1977
Sirana lygropis (Collenette, 1954)

References

Lymantriinae
Noctuoidea genera